Xhafer Sadik (Xhaferr Sadik Dede or Xhafer Sadiku) (1874–1945) was the 4th Dedebaba (or Kryegjysh) of the Bektashi Order. He served as Dedebaba for only 3 months during the summer of 1945.

Biography
Baba Xhafer Sadik was born in 1882 in Gjirokastra, Albania. He served as a dervish under Baba Shemsi of the tekke of Izmir in Turkey. He also served at the tekke of Përmet and was appointed as the baba (leader) of the tekke in 1920 by Baba Ahmet of Turan.

During World War II, he led a small group of pro-Communist fighters in the Dangëllia region. Due to his pro-Communist affiliations, the Communists preferred Xhafer Sadik over Abaz Hilmi, who was highly conservative and resisted liberal reforms proposed by the Communists. As such, he was appointed by the Communist regime to preside over the Fourth National Congress of the Bektashi that was held in 1945 in Tirana. Baba Xhafer died on 2 August 1945.

References

1882 births
1945 deaths
Bektashi dedebabas
Albanian Sufis
Albanian religious leaders
People from Gjirokastër